In mathematics, a Hecke algebra of a locally compact group is an algebra of bi-invariant measures under convolution.

Definition
Let (G,K) be a pair consisting of a unimodular locally compact topological group G and a closed subgroup K of G. Then the space of bi-K-invariant continuous functions of compact support

C[K\G/K] 

can be endowed with a structure of an associative algebra under the operation of convolution. This algebra is denoted 

H(G//K) 

and called the Hecke ring of the pair (G,K). If we start with a Gelfand pair then the resulting algebra turns out to be commutative.

Examples

SL(2)

In particular, this holds when 

G = SLn(Qp) and K = SLn(Zp) 

and the representations of the corresponding commutative Hecke ring were studied by Ian G. Macdonald.

GL(2)

On the other hand, in the case 

G = GL2(Q) and K = GL2(Z) 

we have the classical Hecke algebra, which is the commutative ring of Hecke operators in the theory of modular forms.

Iwahori

The case leading to the Iwahori–Hecke algebra of a finite Weyl group is when G is the finite Chevalley group over a finite field with pk elements, and B is its Borel subgroup. Iwahori showed that the Hecke ring 

H(G//B) 

is obtained from the generic Hecke algebra Hq of the Weyl group W of G by specializing the indeterminate q of the latter algebra to pk, the cardinality of the finite field. George Lusztig remarked in 1984 (Characters of reductive groups over a finite field, xi, footnote):

Iwahori and Matsumoto (1965) considered the case when G is a group of points of a reductive algebraic group over a non-archimedean local field F, such as Qp, and K is what is now called an Iwahori subgroup of G. The resulting Hecke ring is isomorphic to the Hecke algebra of the affine Weyl group of G, or the affine Hecke algebra, where the indeterminate q has been specialized to the cardinality of the residue field of F.

See also 
Group algebra of a locally compact group

References
 
Representation theory